Derry City or City of Derry may refer to:
 Derry, officially Londonderry, a city in Northern Ireland
 Derry City Council, the local authority 1973–2015 for a district including the city
 City of Derry Airport, in Eglinton, County Londonderry
 Derry City F.C., an association football club
 City of Derry R.F.C., a rugby union club
 City of Derry Building Society, a defunct building society

See also  
 Derry (disambiguation)